Willem Muurling (27 April 1805, Bolsward – 9 December 1882, The Hague) was a Dutch theologian who was a native of Bolsward. He was father-in-law to theologian Abraham Kuenen (1828-1891).

He studied theology at Utrecht, and from 1832 to 1837, served as a pastor in Stiens. Afterwards, he taught classes at the Rijksatheneum in Franeker, relocating to the University of Groningen in 1840, where he was as a professor of theology.

Muurling was a prominent member of the so-called "Groningen School", a progressive movement within the Dutch Reformed Church.

Works
Among his better written efforts was a textbook on practical theology titled Practische Godgeleerdheid of beschouwing van de Evangeliebediening. Other published works by Muurling include:
 Louis Gerlach Pareau: Een Levensbeeld; (Louis Gerlach Pareau: A life portrait), 1866. 
 Hervormde Kerk: Een handboek bij de Acad. lessen, Groningen 1851-'57, (Reformed Church: A textbook on the academic lessons at Groningen in 1851–1857).
 Resultaten van onderzoek en ervaring op godsdienst gebied, Groningen 1865-'67, (Results of research and experience in theology at Groningen in 1865–1867).

References 
 Cyclopaedia of Biblical, Theological, and Ecclesiastical Literature (biographical information)
 DBNL Frederiks en van den Branden, Biographisch (translated from Dutch)

1805 births
1882 deaths
Dutch Calvinist and Reformed theologians
People from Bolsward
Academic staff of the University of Groningen
Utrecht University alumni